Gustav Neuring (1879 – 12 April 1919) was a German politician. He died in a lynching.

Neuring was a member of Social Democratic Party of Germany. Following the German Revolution he served as the war minister (Kriegsminister) of the Free State of Saxony (Der Freistaat Sachsen). In April 1919 a mob of war veterans, upset by rumours that their war pensions will be cut, threw him into river Elbe in Dresden. When he tried to get up on the riverbank, Neuring was shot.

References 
 Nigel H. Jones: "Hitler's Heralds - The Story of the Freikorps 1918 - 1923", John Murray (Publishers) Ltd, 1987, 

1879 births
1919 deaths